Distant Earth is German producer André "ATB" Tanneberger's eighth studio album, which was released on 29 April 2011, by Kontor Records. It features 2 CDs in the standard edition, 3 CDs in the limited edition, and 3 CDs + 5 ATB signed postcards + ATB bracelet in the FanBox Limited Edition (which can be ordered on Amazon and it is limited to 2000 copies). Also, there is another 2 CD digipack version that comes with an ATB sticker and it is available only in Germany.

The first CD is an ATB-standard tracks CD, which contains tracks featuring artists like Josh Gallahan, Amurai, Dash Berlin, Sean Ryan, Rea Garvey, Melissa Loretta or JanSoon. The second CD is an ambient / lounge CD which brings us a surprising collaboration with Armin van Buuren for the track called "Vice Versa", and, finally, the third CD contains the club versions of the tracks found on the first CD.

Track listing

Distant Earth Remixed

On 29 July 2011, André announced through his Facebook page that a remixed edition of Distant Earth would be released later that year. The album was released on 16 September 2011. This was the first remix album released by ATB.

Track listing

Charts and certifications

Charts

Certifications

External links

 
 
 
 
 
 ATB's official website
 ATB's official Facebook page
 "Distant Earth" on discogs.com

References

2011 albums
ATB albums